R300 road may refer to:
 R300 road (Ireland)
 R300 road (South Africa)